This is a list of National Football League quarterbacks by total postseason passing touchdowns, and includes the 30 quarterbacks who have thrown for at least 15. 

Tom Brady leads with 88.

Bold denotes a ranked active player.

Players with at least 15 TDs
Totals are through 2022–23 playoffs.

See also
List of National Football League career passing touchdowns leaders
List of National Football League quarterback playoff records
List of National Football League passing yards leaders
List of National Football League passing completions leaders
List of gridiron football quarterbacks passing statistics
List of National Football League career quarterback wins leaders
NFL records (individual)

References

External links
Pro-football-reference.com NFL career playoffs passing touchdowns leaders

Passing touchdowns leaders

National Football League lists